Bob Bryan and Mike Bryan were the defending champions in 2010, but chose not to participate.

Daniel Nestor and Nenad Zimonjić won in the final, 6–3, 7–6(7–5), against Ross Hutchins and Jordan Kerr.

Seeds 

  Daniel Nestor /  Nenad Zimonjić (champions)
  Mardy Fish /  Mark Knowles (first round, retired)
  Łukasz Kubot /  Oliver Marach (quarterfinals)
  František Čermák /  Michal Mertiňák (first round)

Main draw

Draw

External links 
 Main Draw

M